Another Spin Around the Sun is the debut solo album by Canadian alternative rock musician Edwin. It was released on April 27, 1999, in Canada, and July 4, 2000, in the United States. The album marked a musical change in his career from his previous work with I Mother Earth, being more pop-oriented. It spawned five singles "Trippin'", "Hang Ten", "Alive", "And You", and "Rush". The album went Platinum in Canada and was nominated for a Juno Award for Best Rock album in 2000.

Track listing 
 "Theories" (Edwin, David Martin) – 4:36
 "Trippin'" (Edwin, Martin, Ben Dunk) – 3:22
 "Hang Ten" (Edwin, Martin) – 3:32
 "And You" (Edwin, Jack Blades, Jim Huff) – 3:59
 "Screaming Kings" (Edwin, John Keller) – 4:22
 "Shotgun" (Edwin, Ruben Huizenga) – 2:38
 "Alive" (Edwin, Martin, Stephan Moccio) – 6:10
 "Rush" (Edwin, Matt DeMatteo, Martin) – 4:19
 "Amazing" (Edwin, Huizenga) – 4:09
 "Take Me Anywhere" (Edwin, Huizenga) – 4:29
 "Better Than This" (Edwin) – 5:06
 "Another Drink" (hidden track) (Edwin, DeMatteo) - 2:35

Chart positions

Album

Year-end

Singles

Personnel 
 Edwin - Vocals, backing vocals
 Ruben Huizenga - Bass, Keyboards, backing vocals, Piano, Guitar, Producer, Engineer
 Matt DeMatteo - Guitar, Piano, Drums, Keyboards, Programming, backing vocals, Producer, Engineer
 Christian Szczesniak - Guitar, Keyboards
 Stephan Szczesniak - Drums
 Kenneth Cunningham - Bass, Keyboards, Piano
Additional:
 Blake Manning - Percussion, Drums
 Andrew Charters - Bass
 Chris Simpson - Drums
 Tanya Nagowski - Production Coordination
 George Marino - Mastering
 Anne Greenwood - Choir, Chorus
 Annalee Patipatanakoon - Strings
 Roberto Occhipinti - Strings
 Joe L. Britt - Choir, Chorus
 Daniel Mansilla - Percussion
 Mike Roth - A&R
 Melanie Campbell - Choir, Chorus
 Catherine McRae - Art Direction, Design
 Danny Couto - Photography, Animation
 Heather Barnes - Choir, Chorus
 Elizabeth Blastorah - Choir, Chorus
 Sharon Alexander - Choir, Chorus
 Lenny DeRose - Engineer, String Engineer
 Stephan Moccio - String Arrangements
 David Hetherington - Strings
 Fujice Imajishi - Strings
 Mel Mandel - Strings
 Jonathan Craig - Strings
 Roman Borys - Strings
 Marie Berard - Strings
 Douglas Perry - Strings
 Marc-Andre Savoie - Strings
 Mark Skazinetsky - Strings

References 

1999 debut albums
Edwin (musician) albums
Sony Music Canada